Henri was a 364 burthen ton brig that was wrecked upon Reids Mistake, near the entrance to Lake Macquarie, New South Wales, Australia.

Registered in Le Havre, France and owned by French owners, she arrived in Sydney from the Navigator Islands (Samoa) on 8 May 1852. Leaving Sydney in ballast on 8 June, she was caught in bad weather being blown far north and finally arrived off Newcastle on 22 June. Her captain L. Lallier, requested that she return to Sydney for immediate travel to the South Sea Islands.

Fate
While sailing south from Newcastle she was caught in a gale and was wrecked on Reids Mistake, at the entrance to Lake Macquarie on 22 June. One sailor was lost and the wreck was sold by auction.

References

1850s ships
Maritime incidents in June 1852
Ships built in France
Brigs of Australia
1851–1870 ships of Australia
Shipwrecks of the Central Coast Region
Whaling in Australia